Édith Cresson (née Campion; born 27 January 1934) is a French politician from the Socialist Party. She served as Prime Minister of France from 1991 to 1992, the first woman to do so. She was the only woman to be prime minister until 2022, when Élisabeth Borne was appointed. Other than her breakthrough gender role, Cresson’s term was uneventful.  Her political career ended in scandal as a result of corruption charges dating from her tenure as European Commissioner for Research, Science and Technology.

French Prime Minister 
Cresson was appointed to the prime ministerial post by President François Mitterrand on 15 May 1991. She soon became strongly unpopular among the electorate and had to leave office after less than one year, following the Socialists' poor showing in 1992's regional elections. Her premiership is one of the shortest in the history of the Fifth Republic.
Her strong criticism of Japanese trade practices, going so far as to compare the Japanese to "yellow ants trying to take over the world", led to charges of racism. Discussing the sexual activities of Anglo-Saxon males, she said: "Homosexuality seems strange to me. It's different and marginal. It exists more in the Anglo-Saxon tradition than the Latin one."

In social policy, Cresson's government enacted the Urban Framework Act of 1991, which sought to ensure a "right to the city" for all citizens. The
Act required "local bodies to provide living and dwelling conditions which will foster social cohesion and enable conditions of segregation to be avoided." The Cresson Government also placed considerable emphasis during its time in office on facilitating the international competitiveness of firms with under 500 employees. A law was passed in July 1991 which included several measures aimed at improving access of people with disabilities to housing, work places, and public buildings. In addition an Act of July 1991 on legal aid "gave the public (above all, foreigners who are lawfully domiciled in France) wider access to the courts." In January 1992, housing allowances were extended to all low-income households in cities with more than 100 000 inhabitants. Under a law of 10 July 1991, access to legal information “was also included as part of the legal aid system.” A water law was passed in January 1992 "to ensure the protection of water quality and quantity and aquatic ecosystems," and in February 1992 a law was passed to promote citizens' consultation.

Cresson is a member of the Council of Women World Leaders, an International network of current and former women presidents and prime ministers whose mission is to mobilize the highest-level women leaders globally for collective action on issues of critical importance to women and equitable development.

European Commissioner
While a European Commissioner, Cresson was the main target in the fraud allegations that led to the resignation of the Santer Commission in 1999. Subsequent to a fraud inquiry the European Commission said that Cresson in her capacity as the Research Commissioner "failed to act in response to known, serious and continuing irregularities over several years". Cresson was found guilty of not reporting failures in a youth training programme from which vast sums went missing.

Appointing a friend
When Cresson took up her functions, she intended to appoint dental surgeon Philippe Berthelot, one of her close acquaintances, as a "personal advisor". Because Berthelot was 66 years old, he could not be appointed as a member of a Commissioner's Cabinet. When Cresson took up office, her Cabinet was already fully staffed with personal advisors. Berthelot was instead engaged as a "visiting scientist" in September 1995.

Berthelot worked only as a personal advisor to Cresson. His contract expired on 1 March 1997, and he was offered another visiting scientist's contract for a period of one year. EU rules specify a maximum duration of 24 months for visiting scientists, but Berthelot spent two and a half years in the position.

On 31 December 1997, Berthelot requested the termination of his contract on medical grounds, and his application was accepted. A complaint was made by a member of parliament, and a criminal investigation concerning Berthelot was opened in Belgium in 1999. In June 2004, the Chambre du conseil of the Tribunal de première instance de Bruxelles (Court of First Instance, Brussels) decided that no further action should be taken in the case.

European Commission vs. Édith Cresson 

On 11 July 2006, in a judgment by the European Court of Justice on Case C-432/04 (Commission of the European Communities versus Édith Cresson), the Court declared that Édith Cresson acted in breach of her obligations as a European Commissioner. While the breach of the obligations arising from the office of Member of the Commission calls, in principle, for the imposition of a penalty, the Court held that, having regard to the circumstances of the case, the finding of breach constituted, of itself, an appropriate penalty and, accordingly, decided not to impose on Cresson a penalty in the form of a deprivation of her right to a pension or other benefits.

Cresson claimed that where the conduct complained of in criminal and disciplinary proceedings was the same, the findings of the criminal court were binding on the disciplinary authorities. However, the Court held that it was not bound by the legal characterisation of facts made in the context of the criminal proceedings and that it was for the Court, exercising its discretion to the full, to investigate whether the conduct complained of in proceedings brought under Article 213(2) EC constituted a breach of the obligations arising from the office of Commissioner. Accordingly, the decision of the Chambre du conseil of the Tribunal de première instance de Bruxelles that there was no evidence of criminal conduct on Cresson's part could not bind the Court.

Political career

European Commissioner for Research, Innovation and Science, 1995–1999.

Governmental functions

Prime minister, 1991–1992 (Resignation).

Minister of Agriculture, 1981–1983.

Minister of Foreign trade and Tourism, 1983–1984.

Minister of Industrial Redeployment and Foreign Trade, 1984–1986.

Minister of European Affairs, 1988–1990 (Resignation).

Electoral mandates

European Parliament

Member of European Parliament, 1979–1981 (Elected in parliamentary elections, and became minister in 1981). Elected in 1979.

National Assembly of France

Member of the National Assembly of France for Vienne (4th constituency), Elected in 1981, but she became minister in June / 1986–1988. Elected in 1981, reelected in 1986, 1988.

General Council

General councillor of Vienne, 1982–1998 (Resignation). Reelected in 1988, 1994.

Municipal Council

Mayor of Châtellerault, 1983–1997 (Resignation). Reelected in 1989, 1995.

Deputy-mayor of Châtellerault, 1997–2008. Reelected in 2001.

Municipal councillor of Châtellerault, 1983–2008. Reelected in 1989, 1995, 2001.

Mayor of Thuré, 1977–1983.

Municipal councillor of Thuré, 1977–1983.

Cresson's Cabinet, 15 May 1991 – 2 April 1992
Édith Cresson – Prime Minister
Roland Dumas – Minister of Foreign Affairs
Pierre Joxe – Minister of Defense
Philippe Marchand – Minister of the Interior
Pierre Bérégovoy – Minister of Economy, Finance, Budget, and Privatization
Roger Fauroux – Minister of Industry
Martine Aubry – Minister of Labour, Employment, and Vocational Training
Henri Nallet – Minister of Justice
Lionel Jospin – Minister of National Education
Jack Lang – Minister of Culture and Communication
Louis Mermaz – Minister of Agriculture and Forests
Brice Lalonde – Minister of Environment
Frédérique Bredin – Minister of Youth and Sports
Louis Le Pensec – Minister of Overseas Departments and Territories
Paul Quilès – Minister of Transport, Housing, Space, and Equipment
Jean Poperen – Minister of Relations with Parliament
Edwige Avice – Minister of Cooperation and Development
Jean-Pierre Soisson – Minister of Civil Service and Administrative Modernization
Michel Delebarre – Minister of City and Regional Planning
Hubert Curien – Minister of Research and Technology
Jean-Louis Bianco – Minister of Social Affairs and Integration

Personal life
Cresson is married and has two daughters.

Selected publications 
1976: Avec le soleil, Paris: Éditions Jean-Claude Lattès
1989: L'Europe à votre porte: manuel pratique sur les actions de la CEE intéressant les opérateurs économiques, Centre français du commerce extérieur (with Henri Malosse)
1998: Innover ou subir. Paris: éditions Flammarion 
2006: Histoires françaises. Monaco: Éditions du Rocher  (autobiography)

References

Further reading
 Northcutt, Wayne, ed. "Cresson, Edith" in Historical Dictionary of the French Fourth and Fifth Republics, 1946–1991 (Greenwood, 1992) pp 114–16.
 Perry, Sheila. "Gender Difference in French PoliticalCommunication: From Handicap to Asset?." Modern & Contemporary France 13.3 (2005): 337-352.
 Schemla, Élisabeth. Édith Cresson, la femme piégée, Paris: Flammarion, 1993, ; argues her fate was largely due to the misogyny of the Socialist elites, the French political class, and the French media
 Skard, Torild, "Edith Cresson" in Women of Power – Half a century of female presidents and prime ministers worldwide, Bristol: Policy Press, 2014,

External links

Curriculum Vitae as Commissioner
, TIME, 29 March 1999
Q&A on the Commission’s position in the case of Ms Cresson, 19 July 2004

|-

|-

|-

|-

|-

|-

|-

1934 births
Living people
People from Boulogne-Billancourt
Prime Ministers of France
French Ministers of Agriculture
French European Commissioners
Deputies of the 7th National Assembly of the French Fifth Republic
Deputies of the 8th National Assembly of the French Fifth Republic
Deputies of the 9th National Assembly of the French Fifth Republic
Convention of Republican Institutions politicians
Socialist Party (France) politicians
Politicians from Île-de-France
HEC Paris alumni
Women prime ministers
Women European Commissioners
Women government ministers of France
Women members of the National Assembly (France)
Grand Cross of the Ordre national du Mérite
20th-century women rulers
20th-century French women politicians